Bliznyuk or Blyznyuk is a gender-neutral Slavic surname of Ukrainian origin (Близнюк). People with this name include:

Anastasia Bliznyuk (born 1994),  Russian group rhythmic gymnast, Olympian
Bogdan Bliznyuk (born 1995), Ukrainian basketball player 
Gennadi Bliznyuk (born 1980), Belarusian football player and coach
Illya Blyznyuk (born 1973),  Ukrainian football player and coach
Valentin Bliznyuk (1928–2019), Russian aerospace engineer and aircraft designer

Russian-language surnames
Ukrainian-language surnames
Belarusian-language surnames